Felger & Massarotti (or Felger & Mazz) is a Marconi Award-winning afternoon radio show hosted by Michael Felger and Tony Massarotti, airing from 2 to 6 pm in Boston, Massachusetts. The show first aired on August 13, 2009 with the launch of WBZ-FM's sports talk radio station, The Sports Hub on 98.5 FM. The show is known for “calling it like they see it”, which leads to the show’s perceived negative demeanor towards local sports teams, hot takes, and willingness to go after local teams and players.

The show's negativity towards local teams led to a famous bashing of the Boston Red Sox following the departure of two-time World Series champion manager Terry Francona, which resulted in Red Sox principal owner John W. Henry barging into the show in an attempt to defend his team. The show's negativity and bravado have also resulted in several controversies, most notable among them when Felger mocked the deaths of Roy Halladay and Dale Earnhardt. For all the show's negativity, however, it has also been associated with several Boston charities including Cuts for a Cause and Christmas in the City.

The radio show features a simulcast television show that airs on NBC Sports Boston. The simulcast debuted on November 14, 2011 on Comcast SportsNet New England, which was later renamed NBC Sports Boston. Originally owned by CBS Sports Radio, The Sports Hub was sold to Beasley Broadcast Group in November 2017. Felger & Mazz has been a dominant broadcast since its debut in 2009, and has held the top spot for afternoon programming in the Nielsen ratings with the coveted "men aged 25–54" market since 2012.

Show members
 Michael Felger – host
 Tony Massarotti "Mazz" – host
 "Big" Jimmy Murray – sports headlines/co-host 
 James Stewart "J-Stew" – executive producer
 Kevin Maggiore – producer/call screener
 Christopher L. Gasper – Friday weekly guest/fill-in co-host
 "Big Boy" Greg Bedard – Tuesday weekly guest (football season)
 Bob Socci – Friday weekly guest (football season) 
 Paul Perillo – Wednesday weekly guest (football season)/fill-in co-host

Former members
 Mark "Beetle" Bertrand – sports headlines
 Billy Lanni – director of communications/call screener
 Jermaine Wiggins – Tuesday weekly guest (taken over by Greg Bedard)

Segments
 Re-Entry Monday
Big Boy Tuesday w/ Greg Bedard (During the NFL season) (2pm-4pm)
 Agenda Free Friday
 The Final Word
 Mad Mike
 Squeaky Mazz
 The Fuppets
 10 Questions with Greg Bedard
 3 Up and 3 Down
3 Minute Interviews
Mimecast E-Mail of the Day
Mazz's Tiers
Parlay of the Week (Every Friday around 3:30 EST)

References

American comedy radio programs
American sports radio programs